Buginese or Bugis is a language spoken by about five million people mainly in the southern part of Sulawesi, Indonesia.

History

The word Buginese derives from the word  Bugis in Malay. In Buginese, it is called  while the Bugis people are called . According to a Buginese myth, the term  is derived from the name to the first king of Cina, an ancient Bugis kingdom, .  basically means 'the followers of La Sattumpugi'.

Little is known about the early history of this language due to the lack of written records. The earliest written record of this language is Sureq Galigo, the epic creation myth of the Bugis people.

Another written source of Buginese is Lontara, a term which refers to the traditional script and historical record as well. The earliest historical record of Lontara dates to around the 17th century. Lontara records have been described by historians of Indonesia as "sober" and "factual" when compared to their counterparts from other regions of Maritime Southeast Asia, such as the babad of Java. These records are usually written in a matter-of-fact tone with very few mythical elements, and the writers would usually put disclaimers before stating something that they cannot verify.

Prior to the Dutch arrival in the 19th century, a missionary, B. F. Matthews, translated the Bible into Buginese, which made him the first European to acquire knowledge of the language. He was also one of the first Europeans to master Makassarese. The dictionaries and grammar books compiled by him, and the literature and folklore texts he published, remain basic sources of information about both languages.

Upon colonization by the Dutch, a number of Bugis fled from their home area of South Sulawesi seeking a better life. This led to the existence of small groups of Buginese speakers throughout Maritime Southeast Asia.

Classification
Buginese belongs to the South Sulawesi subgroup of the Austronesian language family. Within the South Sulawesi subgroup, it is most closely related to Campalagian.

Geographical distribution
Most of the native speakers (around 3 million) are concentrated in South Sulawesi, Indonesia but there are small groups of Buginese speakers on the island of Java, Samarinda and east Sumatra of Indonesia, east Sabah and Malay Peninsula, Malaysia and South Philippines. This Bugis diaspora is the result of migration since the 17th century that was mainly driven by continuous warfare situations. (Dutch direct colonization started in the early 20th century.)

Phonology 

The following table gives the consonant phonemes of Buginese together with their representation in Lontara script.

The glottal stop  is usually represented by an apostrophe (e.g.

Grammar

Pronouns
Buginese has four sets of personal pronouns, one free set, and three bound sets:

The enclitic set is used with subjects of intransitive verbs, and objects of transitive verbs. The proclitic set is with subjects of transitive verbs. The suffixed set is primarily used in possessive function.

Aspects
The following are grammatical aspects of the language:

Examples

Note that  represents the glottal stop. It is not written in the Lontara script.

Example of usage:

Writing system

Buginese was traditionally written using the Lontara script, of the Brahmic family, which is also used for the Makassar language and the Mandar language. The name Lontara derives from the Malay word for the palmyra palm, the leaves of which are the traditional material for manuscripts in India, South East Asia and Indonesia. Today, however, it is often written using the Latin script.

Buginese Lontara
The Buginese lontara (locally known as ) has a slightly different pronunciation from the other lontaras like the Makassarese.

But unlike most other Brahmic scripts of India, the Buginese script traditionally does not have any virama sign (or alternate half-form for vowel-less consonants, or subjoined form for non-initial consonants in clusters) to suppress the inherent vowel, so it is normally impossible to write consonant clusters (a few ones were added later, derived from ligatures, to mark the prenasalization), geminated consonants or final consonants.

Dialects and subdialects
The Bugis still distinguish themselves according to their major precolony states (Bone, Wajo, Soppeng and Sidenreng) or groups of petty states (around Pare-Pare, Sinjai and Suppa.) The languages of these areas, with their relatively minor differences from one another, have been largely recognized by linguists as constituting dialects: recent linguistic research has identified eleven of them, most comprising two or more sub-dialects.

The following Buginese dialects are listed in the Ethnologue: Bone (Palakka, Dua Boccoe, Mare), Pangkep (Pangkajane), Camba, Sidrap (Sidenreng, North Pinrang, Alitta), Pasangkayu (Ugi Riawa), Sinjai (Enna, Palattae, Bulukumba), Soppeng (Kessi), Wajo, Barru (Pare-Pare, Nepo, Soppeng Riaja, Tompo, Tanete), Sawitto (Pinrang), Luwu (Luwu, Bua Ponrang, Wara, Malangke-Ussu).

Numbers
The numbers are:

Trivia
 A Buginese poem is painted on a wall near the Royal Netherlands Institute of Southeast Asian and Caribbean Studies in Leiden, Netherlands, as one of the wall poems in Leiden.

See also

 Bugis of Sabah
 Bugis
 Pallawa

References

Bibliography

External links

 Buginese Soppeng dialect
 The I La Galigo Epic Cycle of South Celebes and Its Diffusion
 Languages of South Sulawesi
 http://unicode-table.com/en/sections/buginese/
 Kaipuleohone's Robert Blust collection includes materials on Bugis.

Languages of Sulawesi
Languages of Malaysia
South Sulawesi languages